Giuseppe Marchi (2 February 1904 – 17 July 1967) was an Italian professional footballer, who played as a midfielder.

External links 
Profile at MagliaRossonera.it 

1904 births
1967 deaths
Italian footballers
Association football midfielders
Serie A players
A.C. Reggiana 1919 players
A.C. Milan players
Catania S.S.D. players
Sportspeople from Reggio Emilia
Footballers from Emilia-Romagna
Inter Milan non-playing staff
Delfino Pescara 1936 managers
Piacenza Calcio 1919 managers
S.P.A.L. managers
U.S. Fiorenzuola 1922 S.S. managers